Nottingham North is a constituency represented in the House of Commons of the UK Parliament since 2017 by Alex Norris of the Labour and Co-operative party.

Boundaries 

1955–1974: The County Borough of Nottingham wards of Byron, Mapperley, Portland, and St Albans, and the Urban District of Hucknall.

1974–1983: The County Borough of Nottingham wards of Byron, Forest, Mapperley, Portland, Radford, and St Albans.

1983–2010: The City of Nottingham wards of Aspley, Beechdale, Bestwood Park, Bilborough, Bulwell East, Bulwell West, Byron, Portland, and Strelley.

2010–present: The City of Nottingham wards of Aspley, Basford, Bestwood, Bilborough, Bulwell, and Bulwell Forest.

Constituency profile
The constituency consists mostly of residential areas, a majority of neighbourhoods of which were council housing. Of these a slight majority, rather than being social housing, is now private under the Right to Buy, such as Bulwell. Overall, its census Super Output Areas have the lowest income of the three Nottingham constituencies, and was the city's safest seat for the Labour Party, though 2017 and 2019 saw considerable increases in the Conservative vote, in line with other Leave and heavily working-class areas, making this seat now Nottingham's most marginal for Labour. Male unemployment in 2010 was significantly higher than female unemployment in this constituency, which had the highest overall percentage of claimants in the county of Nottinghamshire, slightly more than Nottingham East.

Causes of Unemployment
The decline of coal mining and the textile industry in the area in 1970–2000 brought the highest unemployment in the county to Nottingham North, with a peak of 12.8% of its residents being registered unemployed in 2009.

History
The constituency was created in 1955 and elected Labour candidates as MPs until Richard Ottaway surprisingly gained it for the Conservative Party in their landslide victory of 1983,  before narrowly losing in 1987 to Graham Allen, for Labour, who held it until 2017 when he stood down after 30 years of service. Alex Norris then won the seat for Labour in the 2017 general election.

Members of Parliament

Elections

Elections in the 2010s

Class War Party originally announced Ben Turff as candidate, but he failed to stand.

Elections in the 2000s

Elections in the 1990s

Elections in the 1980s

Elections in the 1970s

(Boundary changes for 1974)

Elections in the 1960s

Elections in the 1950s

See also 
 List of parliamentary constituencies in Nottinghamshire

Notes

References

Politics of Nottingham
Parliamentary constituencies in Nottinghamshire
Constituencies of the Parliament of the United Kingdom established in 1955